The eagle dance is a ritual dance practiced by some American Indians. It is used by the Pueblos to ask for rain, and Iroquois use it to ask for peace and cure. It originated from calumet dance and performed by two to four men with artificial wings on their arms and they produce movements that imitate eagles.

Origin 
Numerous Indian Tribes such as Comanche, Iowa, Iroquois, and Midwestern Calumet performed Eagle Dances to call for divine intervention, because they are believed to carry messages to the Gods. 

Nowadays, Eagle Dance is popular among Native American powwows and it is associated with Tesuque and Jemez in New Mexico, and it is performed during spring. 

Eagle dance differs depending on the tribe, but it normally shows the eagle's life cycle from birth to death. The dance shows how the eagle learns to walk and how it hunts to feed its family. 

In the dance, a chorus of male dancers with bonnets provide singing and drumming accompaniment. Two dancers that represent the male and female eagle has yellow paint found on their lower legs, white paint on upper legs, and bodies that are painted with dark blue. Short white feathers are fastened on their chests, which are painted yellow, and they have wig-like caps that has white feathers and yellow beak. 

Eagle feathers are attached to their arms, and the Indians imitate the eagle's movements with flapping, turning, and swaying motions.

Symbols and customs

Eagle 
The North American Indians admire eagles because they can fly close to the Great Spirit. Therefore, they became a symbol of strength, power, and wisdom. 

Meanwhile, other tribes symbolize eagle as the sun. Their flight is compared to the daily passage of the sun across the sky.

Eagle feathers 
These are sacred for the Native Americans because they view it as a way of how their prayers are brought to heaven.

Native Americans believe that wearing eagle feathers is a great honor. They give these to boys upon maturity. The handling of feathers is considered crucial during the Eagle Dance. The feathers should not touch the ground, and if a feather drops, the tribal elder is the only one allowed to pick it up. The dancer should then thank the elder with a gift. 

Eagle feathers are used in ceremonial ornaments and objects, and plays a role in healing rituals.

Nowadays, Native Americans acquire their feathers by applying for a special permit in the government. Government agencies who find dead eagles provide it to the Native Americans that need them.

References

External links 
History of the Eagle Dance
Cherokee Eagle Dance

Ritual dances
Native American dances